The Tomb of the Unknown Confederate Soldier is a tomb on the grounds of Beauvoir in Biloxi, Mississippi, that holds the remains of an unidentified Confederate soldier of the American Civil War.

The remains were discovered in late 1979 on a battlefield of the Vicksburg Campaign. Artifacts accompanying the remains showed that the person had been a Confederate soldier but did not show the person's identity, unit, or place of origin.

The discovery led to the establishment of the Tomb of the Unknown Confederate Soldier in the Confederate Veterans Cemetery at Beauvoir. The soldier's remains were buried there in a cypress casket in 1980. The tomb, inscribed "Known but to God", was dedicated on June 6, 1981. Approval of the plan and official designation was sought and received from all recognized Confederate organizations, including the Sons of Confederate Veterans, United Daughters of the Confederacy, Military Order of the Stars and Bars, and Children of the Confederacy.

The tomb's two sides are inscribed: "The Unknown Soldier of the Confederate States of America." The head of the tomb bears the inscription: Known but to God. Atop of the tomb is the Great Seal of the Confederate States of America, and at its foot is a stanza from the poem CSA by Abram Joseph Ryan.

See also
 Civil War Unknowns Monument

External links

 

Confederate States of America monuments and memorials in Mississippi
Confederate States of America cemeteries
Tomb of the Unknowns, Confederate
Buildings and structures in Harrison County, Mississippi
1980 establishments in Mississippi